Ardsley and Robin Hood is a ward in the metropolitan borough of the City of Leeds, West Yorkshire, England.  It contains 16 listed buildings that are recorded in the National Heritage List for England.  Of these, three are listed at Grade II*, the middle of the three grades, and the others are at Grade II, the lowest grade.  The ward contains the settlements of East Ardsley, Lofthouse, Robin Hood, Thorpe on the Hill, and West Ardsley, and the surrounding area.  Most of the listed buildings are houses and cottages, farm houses and farm buildings, and the others are a church, memorials in the churchyard, and a former textile mill.


Key

Buildings

References

Citations

Sources

 

Lists of listed buildings in West Yorkshire